Mamert Giedgowd (1843–1863) was a noble from the  family and participant of the January Uprising.

Service in the Imperial Russian Army 
Until the Uprising, he was an officer in the Imperial Russian Army.

1863―1864 Uprising 
In March 1863, he joined the rebel group led by Tomasz Kuszłejko. Together with Adomas Bitė, he was sent to Šiauliai County to assemble weapons and volunteers. Later, he became the commander of a group operatating mainly in the Šiauliai County. On 13 May 1863, his platoon of about 200 people fought in the  forest. After the lost battles, he joined the team of L. Leskauskis and Antanas Mackevičius in Krakiai forest (part of the Krakės-Dotnuva Forest). Captured on June 18, he was exiled to Siberia. Giedgowd escaped and returned to Kuszłejko's group. In autumn 1863, when Kuszłejko emigrated, he went into hiding. After being caught again, he was hung.

Footnotes

Sources 
 
 

1843 births
1863 deaths
January Uprising participants
People executed by the Russian Empire by hanging
19th-century Lithuanian nobility